Greg Toler (born January 2, 1985) is a former American football cornerback. He was drafted by the Arizona Cardinals in the fourth round of the 2009 NFL Draft. Toler was the first and last player from Saint Paul's College, a defunct Division II historically black college in Lawrenceville, Virginia, to be drafted into the NFL.

Early years
He had a few scholarship offers in his senior year at Northwestern High School in Hyattsville, Maryland, but he didn't have the grades that were good enough to attend college. He was working at a local JC Penney's and playing semi-pro football in the Washington, DC-Virginia-Maryland area for the DC Explosion (NAFL), when he was noticed by a coach who worked at Saint Paul's College, Virginia. Toler was eventually awarded a scholarship at Saint Paul's College. Toler made the Central Intercollegiate Athletic Association (CIAA) All-Conference team as a junior and senior.

Professional career

Arizona Cardinals
Considered one of the most intriguing small-school prospects in the 2009 NFL Draft, Toler was graded as the seventh-best cornerback available. He was selected in the fourth round, 131st overall, by the Cardinals, as the first and last St. Paul's Tiger selected in an NFL Draft. He missed the entire 2011 season due to a torn ACL.

Indianapolis Colts
Toler signed with the Indianapolis Colts on March 12, 2013. Toler was placed on injured reserve on January 6, 2014, after suffering a groin injury during the Colts 45-44 Wild Card win over the Kansas City Chiefs.

Washington Redskins
On April 13, 2016, Toler signed a one-year contract with the Washington Redskins.

References

External links
Indianapolis Colts bio
Arizona Cardinals bio
Washington Redskins bio 

1985 births
Living people
African-American players of American football
American football cornerbacks
Saint Paul's Tigers football players
Arizona Cardinals players
Indianapolis Colts players
Washington Redskins players
21st-century African-American sportspeople
20th-century African-American people
Saint Paul's College (Virginia) alumni